In April 1837, a fire broke out in the Indian city of Surat, then under British East India Company rule. It resulted in more than 500 deaths and the destruction of 9,737 houses in a 9 mile radius. It was the most destructive fire in the history of the city.

Fire 
At the time of the fire in 1837, Surat was under the control of the British East India Company. At 5 pm on 24 April, a jar of boiling pitch was spilt and some of the woodwork caught on fire at a house of one of the leading Parsis in Machhalipith neighbourhood. The neighbours refused to allow water from their wells to be used to extinguish the fire. The fire quickly spread to the densely packed neighbouring houses, which had timber frames and wooden eaves overhanging the narrow streets. Within a few hours, the fire spread to an area of three miles due to heavy wind from the north. At night, the large masses of smoke lit by the fire were visible from a distance of twenty to thirty miles. At daybreak on 25 April, the fire's spread shifted due to wind from the southwest. At about 2 pm, the fire was at its height. The fire declined thereafter and ended in the morning on 26 April. The fire had destroyed houses in a 9 mile radius, about three-fourths of the city.

Damage 

Apart from the more than 500 people who died in the fire, 49 additional dead were found. That number includes seven people who died due to the change in the fire's direction on 25 April, 32 people who died while saving their property, and ten people who had tried to save themselves by jumping in a pond or well. 

The total economic loss could not be estimated. A total of 9,373 houses were destroyed. Of those, 6,250 were in the city proper and 3,123 in the suburbs.

Relief 
The British Government granted  for relief, while private donors collected  in Bombay.  were collected in London for relief work.

Aftermath 
After the fire, Surat was affected by a heavy flood in August 1837. Due to these disasters, Parsi, Jain, and Hindu traders moved to Bombay. Later, Bombay surpassed Surat to become the major port of the west coast of India. The city continued to be affected by several fires in subsequent years.

See also 

 2019 Surat fire

References

1837 fires in Asia
Fires in India
History of Surat
History of Gujarat
Disasters in Gujarat
Urban fires in Asia
1837 in India
1837 disasters in India